Brejcha (feminine form: Brejchová) is a Czech surname.

 Boris Brejcha (b. 1981), German techno producer and DJ
 Hana Brejchová, Czech actress
 Jana Brejchová, Czech actress
 Jaroslav Brejcha, Czech slalom canoeist
 Nikola Brejchová, Czech javelin thrower
 Ondřej Brejcha (b. 1994), Czech football player

Czech-language surnames